The Cairo Conference was a November 1943 conference between Chiang Kai-shek, Winston Churchill, and Franklin Roosevelt.

Cairo Conference may also refer to:
 Cairo Conference (1921), a British conference that established the British policy for the Middle East
 Second Cairo Conference, a December 1943 conference between İsmet İnönü, Roosevelt, and Churchill
 International Conference on Population and Development, a 1994 conference of the United Nations Population Fund
 Cairo Anti-war Conference of 2002-2009

See also
List of conferences in Cairo